Neville Hogan is an Irish-American neuroscientist currently the Sun Jae Professor of Mechanical Engineering at Massachusetts Institute of Technology and holds honorary doctorates from Delft University of Technology and Dublin Institute of Technology.

References

Year of birth missing (living people)
Living people
MIT School of Engineering faculty
American neuroscientists
Irish neuroscientists